Frost may refer to the following places in the U.S. state of Michigan:

 Frost, Houghton County, Michigan, in Laird Township
 Frost, Saginaw County, Michigan, in Thomas Township
 Frost Township, Michigan, in Clare County